Miss Universe Bahrain (formerly known as Miss Bahrain) is a beauty pageant established in 2021 under the Yugen Group. The pageant was however founded in 2013, where the winner was supposed to compete in Miss Universe.

Titleholders

Bahraini representatives at Miss Universe

Miss Universe Bahrain

Notes

References

Bahrain
Events in Bahrain
Bahraini awards
2012 establishments in Bahrain